Denis Jančo (born 1 August 1997) is a Slovak footballer who plays as a midfielder for RSC Hamsik Academy.

Club career

AS Trenčín
Jančo made his Fortuna Liga debut for AS Trenčín on 30 May 2015 against ViOn Zlaté Moravce entering in as a substitute in place of Ryan Koolwijk.

References

External links
 FK AS Trenčín profile
 
 Futbalnet profile

1997 births
Living people
Slovak footballers
Slovakia youth international footballers
Association football midfielders
AS Trenčín players
Górnik Zabrze players
FK Poprad players
FC ŠTK 1914 Šamorín players
FK Humenné players
RSC Hamsik Academy players
Slovak Super Liga players
2. Liga (Slovakia) players
Expatriate footballers in Poland
Slovak expatriate sportspeople in Poland
Sportspeople from Trenčín